Chlorotetraedron is a genus of green algae, in the family Neochloridaceae. The name may also be written as Chlorotetraëdon.

References

External links

Sphaeropleales genera
Sphaeropleales